Branchia may refer to:

 Branchia, a gill or similar organ of respiration.
 Branchia (genus), a genus of arthropods.